I Want to Live is a 1976 Austrian drama film directed by Jörg A. Eggers. The film was selected as the Austrian entry for the Best Foreign Language Film at the 50th Academy Awards, but was not accepted as a nominee.

Cast
 Kathina Kaiser as Antonia Mach
 Heinz Bennent as Prof. Wolfgang Mach
 Sonja Sutter as Lucille
 Alwy Becker as Gerlinde Schneiderhahn
 Signe Seidel as Astrid Preisach
 Claudia Butenuth as Eva Vrzal
 Elisabeth Epp as Frau Sandner, Antonias Mutter
 Gertrud Roll as Liesl
 Sylvia Eisenberger as Marianne
 Klaus Barner as Prof. Reiner
 Josef Fröhlich as Vrzal, Oberarzt im Unfallkrankenhaus
 Georg Lhotzky as Georg, TV-Regisseur

See also
 List of submissions to the 50th Academy Awards for Best Foreign Language Film
 List of Austrian submissions for the Academy Award for Best Foreign Language Film

References

External links
 

1976 films
1970s German-language films
1976 drama films
Films directed by Jörg A. Eggers
Austrian drama films